Rafael Lincoln Díaz-Balart y Gutiérrez (January 17, 1926 – May 6, 2005) was a Cuban politician. Díaz-Balart served as Majority Leader of the Cuban House of Representatives and Deputy Secretary of Interior (1952-1954) during the presidency of Fulgencio Batista.

Biography
Born in Banes, Díaz-Balart was the son the mayor of Banes, Rafael José Díaz-Balart. In 1955, Díaz-Balart gave a speech before the Cuban House of Representatives in opposition to the amnesty granted to his former brother-in-law, Fidel Castro, for his involvement in the 1953 attack on the Moncada Barracks. Díaz-Balart was elected senator in 1958, but was unable to take office due to Fidel Castro's rise to power on January 1, 1959.

Díaz-Balart founded La Rosa Blanca (The White Rose), the first anti-Castro organization, in January 1959. He is the father of U.S. Congressmen Lincoln Díaz-Balart and Mario Díaz-Balart, TV news journalist José Díaz-Balart, and investment banker Rafael Díaz-Balart. He is the brother of Mirta Díaz-Balart, Fidel Castro's first wife. His brother, Waldo Díaz-Balart is a painter and a former actor who appeared in two movies by Andy Warhol in the 1960s. His father, Rafael Díaz-Balart was elected to the Cuban House of Representatives in 1936 and his brother-in-law, Juan Caballero, was elected to the Cuban House of Representatives in 1954.

Following his departure from Cuba, Rafael Diaz-Balart spent the following years living in Spain. He worked there as an insurance company executive with Aseguros Iberica La Providencia. This company had investments in real estate companies which developed property on the Spanish Riviera. He then also spent several years serving as a diplomat for the government of Costa Rica in Venezuela and Paraguay.

Díaz-Balart died on May 6, 2005 in his Key Biscayne, Florida home after a battle with leukemia.

The building that houses the Florida International University College of Law bears his name, "Rafael Diaz-Balart Hall", a building designed by Robert A.M. Stern Architects.

References

Bibliography
 50th anniversary of the jail assault that established Castro

 Congressional Testimony of Rafael Diaz-Balart, May 3, 1960

1926 births
2005 deaths
People from Banes, Cuba
Rafael
American politicians of Cuban descent
Hispanic and Latino American state legislators in Florida
Cuban politicians
Members of the Cuban House of Representatives
Cuban emigrants to the United States
People from Key Biscayne, Florida
Deaths from leukemia
Deaths from cancer in Florida
Exiles of the Cuban Revolution in the United States
20th-century Cuban lawyers